Alistair Leak (born 5 April 1992) is a professional rugby league footballer who plays as a hooker for the Batley Bulldogs in the Betfred Championship.

Leak has previously played for the Egremont Rangers.

References

1992 births
Living people
Batley Bulldogs players
Egremont Rangers players
English rugby league players
Rugby league hookers
Rugby league players from Cumbria
Place of birth missing (living people)